or  is a municipality located in Nordland county, Norway. It is part of the traditional district of Salten. The administrative centre of the municipality is the town of Fauske. Some of the villages in Fauske include Nystad, Venset, Straumsnes, and Sulitjelma.

The municipality borders Sweden in the east and the municipalities of Sørfold to the north, Bodø to the west, and Saltdal to the southeast. The town is located on the northern shore of Skjerstad Fjord.

The  municipality is the 90th largest by area out of the 356 municipalities in Norway. Fauske is the 117th most populous municipality in Norway with a population of 9,603.

General information
The municipality was established on 1 January 1905 when the municipality of Skjerstad was divided into Skjerstad (population: 1,709) in the west and Fauske (population: 4,646) in the east. The municipal borders haven't changed since that time. In 1998, the municipality declared township for its administrative centre.

Name
The municipality (originally the parish) is named after the old Fauske farm since the first Fauske Church was built there in 1867.

Coat of arms
The coat of arms was granted on 22 July 1988. The official blazon is "Argent, a reef knot gules". This means the arms have a field (background) that has a tincture of argent which means it is commonly colored white, but if it is made out of metal, then silver is used. The charge is a red reef knot. It was chosen to represent Fauske as a center of commerce and transportation for the region. The arms were designed by Stein Davidsen.

Churches
The Church of Norway has three parishes within the municipality of Fauske. It is part of the Salten prosti (deanery) in the Diocese of Sør-Hålogaland.

Nature

There are two large glaciers in Fauske: Blåmannsisen and the Sulitjelma Glacier; covering about 14% of the municipality. There are many lakes in the municipality, such as Blåmannsisvatnet, Kjelvatnet, Låmivatnet, Langvatnet, Muorkkejávrre, Nedrevatnet, Øvrevatnet, and Vuolep Sårjåsjávrre.

Junkerdal National Park and Sjunkhatten National Park are partly located in Fauske. There are several DNT lodges in this area.

There are many nature reserves in the municipality, such as Veten nature reserve with calcareous pine forest and a rich understory and Fauskeeidet wetland area with rich bird life and observation tower.

There are several caves in the municipality. The fairly easy accessible Svarthamarhola (Svarthamar cave) is one of the largest caves in northern Europe, also hosting one of the world's most northerly bat colonies.

Climate
Fauske is located inside the Arctic circle and has 24 hours of daylight from early May to the beginning of August, with midnight sun from the beginning of June to the second week of July. The area nearly has polar night for part of December because it has sunrise at 11 am and sunset before noon. Average 24-hour temperatures in Fauske is below freezing from mid-November to the last part of March, but the ice-free Skjerstad Fjord moderates winter temperatures. Summer starts in June with moderate summer temperatures lasting until early September.

Daytime temperatures are usually significantly warmer than the 24-hr average from March to September, while there is very little diurnal temperature variation from November to early February as the sun is very low or below the horizon all day. Southwesterly winds can bring thaws anytime in winter, but not in the mountains, which usually get large amounts of snow in winter—the main reason for the large glaciers and the hydropower in the area.

Government
All municipalities in Norway, including Fauske, are responsible for primary education (through 10th grade), outpatient health services, senior citizen services, unemployment and other social services, zoning, economic development, and municipal roads. The municipality is governed by a municipal council of elected representatives, which in turn elect a mayor.  The municipality falls under the Salten District Court and the Hålogaland Court of Appeal.

Municipal council
The municipal council of Fauske is made up of 27 representatives that are elected to four year terms. The party breakdown of the council is as follows:

Mayors
The mayors of Fauske:

1905-1910: Johan Mikal Jørgensen (V)
1910-1911: Johan Ebenhard Jeremiassen (V)
1911-1916: Hartvig Ditlev Glasø (V)
1917-1919: Andreas Johan Hagerup (Ap)
1920-1925: Hartvig Ditlev Glasø (V)
1925-1925: Kristian Hermann Jørgen Evjenth (LL)
1926-1926: Andreas Johan Hagerup (Ap)
1926-1941: Hans Meyer Trondsen (Ap)
1941-1945: Alfred Ingelaus Olsen Engan (NS)
1945-1945: Hans Meyer Trondsen (Ap)
1946-1959: Joakim Ingemann Pedersen Kosmo (Ap)
1960-1968: Kåre Klette (Ap)
1968-1983: Erling Johan Storjord (Ap)
1984-1991: Andreas Johan Moan (Ap)
1991-1999: Anne Stenhammer (SV)
2000-2007: Kjell Eilertsen (Ap)
2007-2011: Odd Henriksen (H)
2011-2015: Siv Anita Johnsen Brekke (Ap)
2015-2019: Jørn Stene (LL)
2019–present: Marlen Rendall Berg (Sp)

Economy

Manufacturing, mining and working in quarries employs 9% of the work force (as of 2021). Several marble quarries are located in the municipality. The marble is exported to many countries, where it can be observed in many monumental buildings, among them the United Nations Headquarters in New York City. There are also dolomite quarries in Fauske, as well as some agriculture. Case work for permission for renewed mining in Sulitjelma, has been going on since the early 2010s; mining there was discontinued in 1991.

Salten Kraftsamband and Fauske Lysverk are important employers in Fauske. The town is a commercial centre for parts of the inland areas of Salten, and has hotel and camping facilities. FK Fauske/Sprint is the local soccer team. Historically, mining in Sulitjelma was very important.

Transportation
The Nordland Line passes through the municipality, reaching Bodø west of Fauske. Travellers going further north usually leave the train in Fauske, and travel by express bus to Narvik or further, using European route E6 which goes through the center of Fauske. The E6 from Mo i Rana north to Fauske crosses over the Saltfjellet mountains, and the E6 further north to Narvik also goes through very rugged terrain; these are among the most scenic drives in Norway, although there are many tunnels in the Sørfold area.

The Norwegian County Road 830 runs from the town of Fauske to the east to the village of Sulitjelma. The road passes through several tunnels: Grønnlifjell Tunnel, Hårskolten Tunnel, Sjønståfjell Tunnel, and Stokkviknakken Tunnel. The road follows the old Sulitjelma Line railroad.

Notable people

 Mons Andreas Petersen (1829 in Lakså – 1886), a Norwegian Sami farmer, discovered ore deposits in Sulitjelma in 1858 which became the Sulitjelma Mines
 Peter Vogelius Deinboll DSO, MC (1915 in Sulitjelma – 1944), an engineer, and Norwegian resistance member during WWII
 Jacob Jervell (1925 in Fauske – 2014), a theologian, professor emeritus, author and priest
 Eystein Husebye (born 1937 in Sulitjelma), a Norwegian seismologist and academic  
 Ivar Antonsen (born 1946 in Fauske), a Norwegian jazz pianist and composer
 Jørgen Kosmo (1947 Fauske – 2017), a Norwegian politician, Auditor General of Norway 2005-2013 & President of the Storting
 Trine Angelsen, (Norwegian Wiki) (born 1965 in Fauske), a Norwegian author
 Frode Nymo (born 1975), a jazz musician, plays alto saxophone; brought up in Valnesfjord
 Atle Nymo (born 1977 in Valnesfjord), a jazz musician, plays tenor saxophone and bass clarinet
 Christel Alsos (born 1984 in Fauske), a Norwegian singer

Sport 
 Simon Slåttvik (1917 in Valnesfjord – 2001), a Norwegian skier, gold medallist at the 1952 Winter Olympics
 Alexander Os (born 1980 in Fauske), a former Norwegian biathlete, competed at the 2010 Winter Olympics
 Ruben Imingen (born 1986 in Fauske), a former Norwegian footballer with 164 club caps

References

External links
Municipal fact sheet from Statistics Norway 

Weather forecast and statistics for Fauske in english

 
Municipalities of Nordland
Populated places of Arctic Norway
1905 establishments in Norway